MyGate.app is an Indian security and community management app headquartered in Bangalore, India.This app helps in notifying users information about people entering their gated-community. The company was founded in 2016 and is a subsidiary of its parent company Vivish Technologies.

The company has a presence across 100 cities in India.

MyGate came up with a community management solution to take brands to people’s homes if they could not go out. Last week, the platform formally launched its Community Engagement Platform (CEP) which it says will give brands an opportunity to meaningfully interact with over 3 million homes in 20,000 gated communities.

History 
The app MyGate was first launched in Bangalore in June 2016 by Vijay Arisetty, Abhishek Kumar, Shreyans Daga, and Vivaik Bhardwaj. It is owned and operated by Vivish Technologies, a company also based in Bangalore, India.

The company received its initial round of funding in 2018, with a $2.5 million investment from Prime Venture and opened offices in seven cities.

In 2019, the company partnered with Swiggy, Zomato, FreshMenu, Dunzo, Box 8, eat.fit, etc. and appointed Praveen Boda as head of finance, and Diwesh Sahai as head of technology.

In April 2020, the company tied up with Grofers, ITC and StoreSe and also launched the Karnataka State Police Clear Pass app to allow Karnataka Police to issue e-passes to Government companies in Bangalore during the Covid-19 lockdown for which it was awarded a certificate by the State of Karnataka Police.

In June, MyGate implemented  PDP guidelines to protect user privacy and to allow users to retain control over their own information.

MyGate has implemented a property search feature on its app called MyGate Homes that allows users to list properties for buying, selling and renting on the app. Homes later expanded into allied services, including rental agreements, legal services, property management and more. 

In August, the company started buyback program to repurchase up to ₹37.2 crore shares.

In 2021, the company ventured into Community Omnicommerce space by launching MyGate Exclusives on its app, which curates household and essential products.  

The company expanded its operations to Pune and Kolkata and registered 1300 and 700 new societies respectively on its platform. MyGate laid off hundreds of employees since May 2021 owing to pandemic woes.

Personal Data Protection 
MyGate has implemented PDP on its platform in June 2020 to safeguard user privacy and allow users to retain control over their own information. The company also announced that it was going to make all its societies compliant with the requirements prescribed in the Personal Data Protection Bill, 2019. PDR gives individuals more control over their personal data, ensuring that it be obtained in a fair and lawful manner and used only for specified purposes. It also grants users the right to know what information is held about them, when their details were viewed, by whom, and for which reason. All personal data are kept confidential and stored in a secured manner.

Lawsuits 
In June 2020 Business Standard reported that MyGate and competitor NoBroker.com had filed competing lawsuits each charging the other with theft of proprietary customer data.

Funding 
MyGate has raised a total of $67.2 million in funding over three rounds. 

In January 2018, as part of a seed round of funding, the company received $2.5 million for its technology platform. The funding round was led by a Bangalore-based seed fund Prime Venture Partners (PVP). 

In October 2018, as part of a Series A round of funding, the company raised 65 crores from Prime Venture Partners. 

In October 2019, as part of a Series B round of financing, the company received $56 million from Tiger Global Management, Tencent Holdings, JS Capital and existing investor PVP.

Acquisitions 
Society and community management start-up MyGate has acquired MyCommunity Genie, a Bengaluru-based social commerce platform, in a part-cash, part-equity deal.

See also 
  List of Indian IT companies

References 

Information technology companies of India
Technology companies of India
Companies based in Bangalore
Indian companies established in 2016
Information technology companies of Bangalore
Software companies of India
Security companies of India
2016 establishments in Karnataka